Gamma Scuti, Latinized from γ Scuti, is a single, white-hued star in the southern constellation of Scutum. The apparent visual magnitude of 4.67 indicates this is a dim star but visible to the naked eye. Based upon an annual parallax shift of 10.21 mas as seen from Earth, this star is located about 319 light years from the Sun. Currently it is moving towards the Solar System at 41 km/s, which means in 2.35 million years it will pass at just  distance, probably becoming the brightest star in the night sky, at magnitude −2.1, for a period.

This is an A-type main-sequence star with a stellar classification of A2:V. At the age of 237 million years, it is spinning rapidly with a projected rotational velocity of 222 km/s. This is giving the star an oblate shape with a prominent equatorial bulge that is estimated to be 21% larger than the polar radius. The star has an estimated 2.91 times the mass of the Sun and 4.1 times the Sun's radius. It is radiating 150 times the Sun's luminosity from its photosphere at an effective temperature of 9,016 K.

References

A-type main-sequence stars
Scuti, Gamma
Scutum (constellation)
BD-14 5071
170296
090595
6930
TIC objects